Prospect Park is a borough in Passaic County, New Jersey, United States. As of the 2010 United States Census, the borough's population was 5,865, reflecting an increase of 86 (+1.5%) from the 5,779 counted in the 2000 Census, which had in turn increased by 726 (+14.4%) from the 5,053 counted in the 1990 Census.

The borough of Prospect Park was formed by an act of the New Jersey Legislature on March 13, 1901, from portions of the now-defunct Manchester Township. The borough was named for Prospect Park, Brooklyn.

It is a dry town, where alcohol cannot be sold, as affirmed by an ordinance passed in 1978.

Geography
According to the United States Census Bureau, the borough had a total area of 0.47 square miles (1.22 km2), including 0.47 square miles (1.20 km2) of land and 0.01 square miles (0.01 km2) of water (1.06%).

The borough borders the Passaic County municipalities of Haledon, Hawthorne, North Haledon and Paterson.

Demographics

Census 2010

The Census Bureau's 2006–2010 American Community Survey showed that (in 2010 inflation-adjusted dollars) median household income was $63,194 (with a margin of error of +/− $9,308) and the median family income was $65,625 (+/− $6,456). Males had a median income of $43,109 (+/− $6,443) versus $30,142 (+/− $9,427) for females. The per capita income for the borough was $20,993 (+/− $2,145). About 12.0% of families and 11.4% of the population were below the poverty line, including 20.4% of those under age 18 and 20.0% of those age 65 or over.

Same-sex couples headed 8 households in 2010, a decline from the 11 counted in 2000.

Census 2000

As of the 2000 United States Census there were 5,779 people, 1,822 households, and 1,432 families residing in the borough. The population density was 12,043.7 people per square mile (4,648.5/km2). There were 1,889 housing units at an average density of 3,936.8 per square mile (1,519.5/km2). The racial makeup of the borough was 61.17% White, 13.65% African American, 0.42% Native American, 3.15% Asian, 0.07% Pacific Islander, 13.70% from other races, and 7.84% from two or more races. Hispanic or Latino of any race were 38.26% of the population.

There were 1,822 households, out of which 44.7% had children under the age of 18 living with them, 52.7% were married couples living together, 20.0% had a female householder with no husband present, and 21.4% were non-families. 17.0% of all households were made up of individuals, and 6.6% had someone living alone who was 65 years of age or older. The average household size was 3.17 and the average family size was 3.56.

In the borough the population was spread out, with 29.6% under the age of 18, 10.3% from 18 to 24, 32.8% from 25 to 44, 18.5% from 45 to 64, and 8.8% who were 65 years of age or older. The median age was 31 years. For every 100 females, there were 90.8 males. For every 100 females age 18 and over, there were 84.7 males.

The median income for a household in the borough was $46,434, and the median income for a family was $49,405. Males had a median income of $31,951 versus $26,569 for females. The per capita income for the borough was $16,410. About 7.9% of families and 10.0% of the population were below the poverty line, including 14.4% of those under age 18 and 6.2% of those age 65 or over.

As part of the 2000 Census, 1.7% of Prospect Park's residents identified themselves as being of Albanian ancestry. This was the 11th-highest percentage of Albanian American people in any place in the United States with 1,000 or more residents identifying their ancestry. In the same census, 3.2% of Prospect Park's residents identified themselves as being of Arab American ancestry. This was the sixth-highest percentage of Arab American people in any place in the United States with 1,000 or more residents identifying their ancestry.

Government

Local government
Prospect Park is governed under the Borough form of New Jersey municipal government, which is used in 218 municipalities (of the 564) statewide, making it the most common form of government in New Jersey. The governing body is comprised of the Mayor and the Borough Council, with all positions elected at-large on a partisan basis as part of the November general election. The Mayor is elected directly by the voters to a four-year term of office. The Borough Council is comprised of six members elected to serve three-year terms on a staggered basis, with two seats coming up for election each year in a three-year cycle. The Borough form of government used by Prospect Park is a "weak mayor / strong council" government in which council members act as the legislative body with the mayor presiding at meetings and voting only in the event of a tie. The mayor can veto ordinances subject to an override by a two-thirds majority vote of the council. The mayor makes committee and liaison assignments for council members, and most appointments are made by the mayor with the advice and consent of the council.

, the Mayor of Prospect Park is Democrat Mohamed Khairullah, whose term of office ends December 31, 2026. Khairullah was appointed to the office in 2005, after his predecessor Will Kubofcik vacated his seat to move out of the borough; he has since been elected to four full terms. Members of the Borough Council are Council President Anand Shah (D, 2025), Robert Artis (D, 2023), Mohammed A. Hussain (D, 2025), Alaa Matari (D, 2024), Felicia Ortiz (D, 2023), and Esther Perez (D, 2024).

Samir Hayek resigned from office in July 2017, citing personal reason for leaving the seat expiring in December 2018.

In September 2016, Esther Perez, who had previously served 12 years on the borough council, was selected to fill the seat expiring in December 2018 that had been held by Richard Esquiche until he resigned from office the previous month. Perez was elected in November 2016 to serve the balance of the term of office.

Federal, state and county representation
Prospect Park is located in the 9th Congressional District and is part of New Jersey's 35th state legislative district.

 

Passaic County is governed by Board of County Commissioners, comprised of seven members who are elected at-large to staggered three-year terms office on a partisan basis, with two or three seats coming up for election each year as part of the November general election in a three-year cycle. At a reorganization meeting held in January, the board selects a Director and Deputy Director from among its members to serve for a one-year term. 
, Passaic County's Commissioners are 
Director Bruce James (D, Clifton, term as commissioner ends December 31, 2023; term as director ends 2022),
Deputy Director Cassandra "Sandi" Lazzara (D, Little Falls, term as commissioner ends 2024; term as deputy director ends 2022),
John W. Bartlett (D, Wayne, 2024),
Theodore O. "T.J." Best Jr. (D, Paterson, 2023),
Terry Duffy (D, West Milford, 2022),
Nicolino Gallo (R, Totowa, 2024) and 
Pasquale "Pat" Lepore (D, Woodland Park, 2022).
Constitutional officers, elected on a countywide basis are
County Clerk Danielle Ireland-Imhof (D, Hawthorne, 2023),
Sheriff Richard H. Berdnik (D, Clifton, 2022) and 
Surrogate Zoila S. Cassanova (D, Wayne, 2026).

Politics
As of March 23, 2011, there were a total of 3,139 registered voters in Prospect Park, of which 1,710 (54.5% vs. 31.0% countywide) were registered as Democrats, 345 (11.0% vs. 18.7%) were registered as Republicans and 1,084 (34.5% vs. 50.3%) were registered as Unaffiliated. There were no voters registered to other parties. Among the borough's 2010 Census population, 53.5% (vs. 53.2% in Passaic County) were registered to vote, including 74.8% of those ages 18 and over (vs. 70.8% countywide).

In the 2012 presidential election, Democrat Barack Obama received 82.9% of the vote (1,744 cast), ahead of Republican Mitt Romney with 16.5% (348 votes), and other candidates with 0.6% (12 votes), among the 2,130 ballots cast by the borough's 3,402 registered voters (26 ballots were spoiled), for a turnout of 62.6%. In the 2008 presidential election, Democrat Barack Obama received 1,721 votes (75.9% vs. 58.8% countywide), ahead of Republican John McCain with 474 votes (20.9% vs. 37.7%) and other candidates with 15 votes (0.7% vs. 0.8%), among the 2,267 ballots cast by the borough's 3,387 registered voters, for a turnout of 66.9% (vs. 70.4% in Passaic County). In the 2004 presidential election, Democrat John Kerry received 1,325 votes (64.8% vs. 53.9% countywide), ahead of Republican George W. Bush with 655 votes (32.0% vs. 42.7%) and other candidates with 22 votes (1.1% vs. 0.7%), among the 2,046 ballots cast by the borough's 3,270 registered voters, for a turnout of 62.6% (vs. 69.3% in the whole county).

In the 2013 gubernatorial election, Democrat Barbara Buono received 62.3% of the vote (690 cast), ahead of Republican Chris Christie with 36.0% (398 votes), and other candidates with 1.7% (19 votes), among the 1,143 ballots cast by the borough's 3,502 registered voters (36 ballots were spoiled), for a turnout of 32.6%. In the 2009 gubernatorial election, Democrat Jon Corzine received 743 ballots cast (66.1% vs. 50.8% countywide), ahead of Republican Chris Christie with 310 votes (27.6% vs. 43.2%), Independent Chris Daggett with 33 votes (2.9% vs. 3.8%) and other candidates with 9 votes (0.8% vs. 0.9%), among the 1,124 ballots cast by the borough's 3,116 registered voters, yielding a 36.1% turnout (vs. 42.7% in the county).

Education

The Prospect Park School District serves public school students in pre-kindergarten through eighth grade at Prospect Park Elementary School. As of the 2019–2020 school year, the district, comprised of one school, had an enrollment of 878 students and 64.0 classroom teachers (on an FTE basis), for a student–teacher ratio of 13.7:1. The school population was made up of Hispanic (54%), White (22%), Black (22%), and Other (2%).

For ninth through twelfth grades, public school students attend Manchester Regional High School, which serves students from Haledon, North Haledon, and Prospect Park. The school is located in Haledon. The Manchester district participates in the Interdistrict Public School Choice Program, which allows non-resident students to attend the district's schools without cost to their parents, with tuition paid by the state. Available lots are announced annually by grade. As of the 2019–2020 school year, the high school had an enrollment of 796 students and 64.4 classroom teachers (on an FTE basis), for a student–teacher ratio of 12.4:1. Seats on the high school district's nine-member board of education are allocated based on the population of the constituent districts, with two seats assigned to Prospect Park.

Students are also eligible to attend the Passaic County Technical Institute, a countywide program located in Wayne.

Transportation

Roads and highways

The only significant road serving Prospect Park is County Route 504. It enters from Haledon, following Haledon Avenue along the borough's southwestern border with Haledon and Paterson. It then crosses completely into Paterson, turns onto Main Street and reenters Prospect Park for a brief stretch before exiting into Hawthorne.

Public transportation
NJ Transit provides local bus service on the 722 and 744 routes.

Notable people

People who were born in, residents of, or otherwise closely associated with Prospect Park include:

 Lini De Vries (1905–1982, born Lena Moerkerk), author, public health nurse, and teacher
 Johnny Vander Meer (1914–1997), MLB pitcher, most notably for the Cincinnati Reds, best known as the only pitcher in Major League Baseball history to throw two consecutive no-hitters

References

External links

 Prospect Park Borough official website
 Prospect Park Elementary School
 
 School Data for the Prospect Park Elementary School, National Center for Education Statistics
 Manchester Regional High School

 
1901 establishments in New Jersey
Arab-American culture in New Jersey
Borough form of New Jersey government
Boroughs in Passaic County, New Jersey
Populated places established in 1901